Stenotrophomonas chelatiphaga is an aerobic, Gram-positive and motile bacterium from the genus of Stenotrophomonas which has been isolated from sewage sludge from Kazan in Russia. Stenotrophomonas chelatiphaga has the ability to degrade Ethylenediaminetetraacetic acid.

References

Further reading 
 

Xanthomonadales
Bacteria described in 2010